Imma albifasciella is a moth in the family Immidae. It was described by Arnold Pagenstecher in 1900. It is found on the Bismarck Archipelago and in Australia, where it has been recorded from Queensland.

The wingspan is about 20 mm. The forewings are dark ochreous fuscous with a nearly straight snow-white line from the costa at three-fifths to the inner margin at two-thirds. The hindwings are black.

References

Moths described in 1900
Immidae
Moths of Australia